The 1936 Kent State Golden Flashes football team was an American football team that represented Kent State University in the Ohio Athletic Conference (OAC) during the 1936 college football season. In its second season under head coach Donald Starn, Kent State compiled a 4–4 record.

Schedule

References

Kent State
Kent State Golden Flashes football seasons
Kent State Golden Flashes football